Southland District Council is the territorial authority for the Southland District of New Zealand.

The council is led by the mayor of Southland, who is currently . There are also 12 ward councillors.

Composition

Councillors

 Mayor: 
 Mararoa Waimea Ward: John Douglas, Ebel Kremer, Rob Scott
 Waiau Aparima Ward: Don Byars, George Harpur, Karyn Owen
 Oreti Ward: Darren Frazer, Christine Menzies, Margie Ruddenklau
 Waihopai Toetoe Ward: Paul Duffy, Julie Keast
 Stewart Island/Rakiura Ward: Bruce Ford

Community boards

 Ardlussa Community Board: Richard Clarkson, Ray Dickson, Chris Dillon, Paul Eaton, Clarke Horrell, Hilary Kelso, Councillor Rob Scott
 Fiordland Community Board: Sarah Greaney, Diane Holmes, Ben Killeen, Ryan Murray, Max Slee, Mary Chartres, Councillor Ebel Kremer
 Northern Community Board: Greg Tither, Lance Hellewell, Carolyn Smith, Peter Bruce, Pam Naylor, Sonya Taylor, Councillor John Douglas
 Oreti Community Board: Brian Sommerville, Natasha Mangels, Andrew Dorricott, Colin Smith, Geoff Jukes, Peter Schmidt, Treena Symons, Councillor Darren Frazer
 Stewart Island/Rakiura Community Board: Jon Spraggon, Steve Lawrence, Aaron Conner, Anita Geeson, Gordon Leask, Rakiura Herzhoff, Councillor Bruce Ford
 Tuatapere Te Waewae Community Board: Margaret Thomas, Ann Horrell, Blayne De Vries, Maurice Green, Alistair McCracken, Keri Potter, Councillor George Harpur
 Wallace Takitimu Community Board: André Bekhuis, Maureen Johnston, David Cowie, Kelly Day, Bev Evans, Peter Gutsell, Councillor Don Byars
 Oraka Aparima Community Board: Graeme Stuart, Sharon Ayto, Julie Guise, Anette Horrell, Neil Linscott, Robin McCall, Councillor Karyn Owen
 Waihopai Toetoe Community Board: Pam Yorke, Denise Fodie, Pani Grey-Thomas, Gay Munro, Melanie Shepherd, George Stevenson, Andrea Straith, Councillor Julie Keast

History

The council was formed in 1989, replacing Southland County Council (1876-1989), Stewart Island County Council (1876-1989), Wallace County Council (1876-1989), and Winton County Council (1877-1989).

In 2020, the council had 159 staff, including 37 earning more than $100,000. According to the Taxpayers' Union think tank, residential rates averaged $1,914.

References

External links
 Official website

Southland District
Politics of Southland, New Zealand
Territorial authorities of New Zealand